James Dean (also known as James Dean: Portrait of a Friend) is a 1976 NBC television film about actor James Dean and starring Stephen McHattie in the title role.

The role of screenwriter William Bast, Dean's best friend, is played by Michael Brandon. This portrayal is based on the 1956 biography by Bast, which recounts the early acting career and rise of Dean. The film paints a clear picture of James Dean's pursuit for authenticity, depth and artistic meaning. Bast claimed that Dean's inspiration as an actor was inspired by what he learned from Antoine de Saint-Exupéry's 1943 novella The Little Prince.

References

External links

1976 films
NBC network original films
Films scored by Billy Goldenberg
Biographical films about actors
Cultural depictions of James Dean
1970s English-language films
Films directed by Robert Butler